Alfred Samuel Walker (26 August 1884 – 14 September 1961) was an English footballer who played in the Football League for Wolverhampton Wanderers.

Career
Walker played for Wolverton, Northampton Town and Brentford, before joining Wolverhampton Wanderers for a £150 fee in April 1910. He scored twice 35 games for the club, as they posted eighth and ninth places finishes in the Football League Second Division in 1909–10 and 1910–11. He joined non-league Port Vale in 1911, and enjoyed regular football in Burslem, helping the club to lift the Birmingham Senior Cup in 1913. However, he lost his place in October 1913 and after colliding with low railings at The Old Recreation Ground on 26 January 1914 was out of action for some time. He was released at the end of the season and moved on to Scottish side Dunfermline Athletic.

Later life
By 1949, Walker was working as the managing director of Sanitary Supply Co Ltd in Burslem.

Career statistics
Source:

Honours
Port Vale
Birmingham Senior Cup: 1913

References

Footballers from Holloway, London
English footballers
Association football outside forwards
Wolverton A.F.C. players
Northampton Town F.C. players
Leyton F.C. players
Brentford F.C. players
Wolverhampton Wanderers F.C. players
Dunfermline Athletic F.C. players
Port Vale F.C. players
Southern Football League players
English Football League players
1884 births
1961 deaths